The Age of Persuasion is a Canadian radio series which aired on CBC Radio One for 107 episodes over five seasons between 2006 and 2011, and also broadcast on Chicago public radio station WBEZ. A sequel to the earlier O'Reilly on Advertising, the series is hosted by Terry O'Reilly and explores the sociological and cultural impact of advertising on modern life.

Each episode uses humour and numerous excerpts from historical radio broadcasts and commercials to make its point.

Many episodes are available in streaming MP3 format from the program's CBC website.  Some are available in podcast form at the unofficial site CBC Podcasts. On December 24, 2010 the Age of Persuasion blog announced that the CBC would be podcasting the show starting in January 2011.

The show's creators, Terry O'Reilly and Mike Tennant, have released a book: The Age of Persuasion: How Marketing Ate Our Culture, (Knopf Canada & Vintage Paperbacks). The book is published in the  United States by Counterpoint Press.

As late as November 2011, O'Reilly had indicated that a sixth season of AoP would begin that January. However, in December 2011, O'Reilly revealed that AoP would in fact be replaced at that time by a new series, Under the Influence, reflecting the shift of marketing from a "one-way conversation" to a "delicate dialogue".

Episode list

Note: Starting in season 2, episodes in italics are repeat broadcasts. Links in the episode title take you to an online copy of the episode.  Links in the date take you to a summary only.

Season 1

Season 2

Season 3

Season 4

Season 5

Opening theme
The title theme, composed by Ari Posner and Ian LeFeuvre, consists of a series of ten sound clips from ads and speeches, played over the theme music. Static is heard between each clip, giving the impression of changing between stations on a radio. The title is announced in the middle of the clips. In each episode, one clip is different, similar to the couch gag in the opening to The Simpsons.

Theme lyrics

Season 1

Season 2

Season 3

Season 4

Season 5

Running gags
In the opening theme, one sound clip is changed in each episode which, when following the previous clip, makes up a nonsense sentence. Depending on the season, the preceding clip is either Franklin D. Roosevelt's "The only thing we have to fear is..." (from his famous inauguration speech)(seasons 1, 3 & 4), a man saying, "I can't believe I ate that whole..." (from a commercial for Alka-Seltzer)(season 2), or an announcer saying "Tonight's episode brought to you by..." (season 5).
When Terry sets up the premise for an episode in the form of a letter from a listener, there is usually a postscript confusing Terry with retired ice hockey player Joseph James Terrence "Terry" O'Reilly, who played as a right-winger for the Boston Bruins.
Terry directly interacts with "Keith" (Ohman, the engineer), usually to get him to play a recording clip. On more than one occasion, Keith has been asked for a hammer, which is then used to destroy a piece of electronic equipment playing something especially irksome.
When it is necessary to define a phrase or concept, the definition is usually delivered by Steve Gardner, over a clip of upbeat 1950s-style educational film music.
After Terry makes a pun, he "puts a dollar in the Age of Persuasion pun jar", accompanied by the sound of change being dropped into a glass jar. Examples include Home Depot having "nailed down" its emotional hook and Beethoven being able to reject "overtures" from nobles.
When Terry mentions an object with potentially injurious consequences, such as a Taser or a pneumatic nail gun, a sound effect of the device in action is played, followed by a man with a low-pitched voice quietly saying, "Ow."
Throughout season 4, co-creator Mike Tennant appears on location in various settings, such as in the audience of a medicine show or as a shill in an auction.
During the end credits, the announcer makes commentary on the people mentioned, the comments invariably being linked to the episode's theme. The announcer is the same woman for all seasons except Season 3, when she was replaced by a man (Mike Tennant) who began the credits by saying, "Say, folks..."

End Credits
(Seasons 1–4) 
Created and written by Terry O'Reilly and Mike Tennant
Engineer, Keith Ohman
Title music by Ari Posner and Ian Lefeuvre
The Age of Persuasion is produced for CBC Radio by Pirate Radio & Television, Toronto

(Season 5) 
Written by Terry O'Reilly
Engineer, Keith Ohman
Title music by Ari Posner and Ian Lefeuvre
Created by Terry O'Reilly and Mike Tennant
The Age of Persuasion is produced by Pirate Toronto & New York

Awards

New York Festivals, World's Best Radio Programs & Promotions

AOP Goes to the Movies
Business/Consumer Issues: Gold
Best Writing: Silver

Speed Bumps
Best Writing: Silver
Business/Consumer Issues: Bronze

Grand Award: AOP Goes to the Movies

New York Festivals, World's Best Radio Programs & Promotions

The Happy Homemaker: How Advertising Invented the Housewife
Business/Consumer Issues: Gold

Luxury Advertising
Best Writing: Silver

Grand Award: The Happy Homemaker: How Advertising Invented the Housewife

References

External links
 Official Age of Persuasion podcast at the CBC, starting January 2011.
Official CBC website for the show As of 28 July 2008 this contained streaming content of all the episodes in the series 3, as well as some earlier episodes.
iTunes Podcast link
Unofficial Age of Persuasion podcast at feedburner.com
Unofficial Age of Persuasion podcast at castroller.com
Terry O'Reilly's Webpage
Mike Tennant's Webpage

CBC Radio One programs
2006 radio programme debuts
Canadian talk radio programs
Canadian documentary radio programs
Radio documentaries about advertising